HawkEye 360 is an American geospatial analytics company headquartered in Herndon, Virginia. It is a commercial seller of radio frequency (RF) signal location data gathered by a satellite constellation.

History 
In 2015, HawkEye 360 was started with the idea of using space and RF technology to generate usable data by advanced signal geolocation using small satellites. The main idea was to collect and geolocate RF signals for commercial use. In some time the company received initial seed financing from Allied Minds, a Boston-based venture capital firm, to expand the business.

In 2016, HawkEye 360 began contracting the construction of their Pathfinder cluster of satellites with Deep Space Industries (DSI) and UTIAS Space Flight Laboratory (SFL). In November 2016, the company completed the initial Series A round led by Razor's Edge Ventures with major participation from defense industrial base leader, Raytheon. While waiting for the satellites to be built and launched, the company began exhibiting their technology through flight demonstrations  and successfully received a patent for determining the location of RF transmitters.

The company's advisory board includes former members of the National Geospatial-Intelligence Agency, retired Army and Air Force general officers, and former Intelligence Community leaders.

In December 2018, HawkEye 360 launched the company's first set of small satellites, known as the Pathfinder cluster, into orbit as part of the Spaceflight's SSO-A SmallSat Express ride-share aboard a SpaceX Falcon9. The satellites, in both this first cluster and a later second cluster, were built by UTIAS Space Flight Laboratories (SFL)

In April 2019, it released the first product - RFGeo, whose purpose is to identify and locate RF signals so customers can then view and analyze data.

In October 2019, HawkEye 360 expanded the company's signal waveform library to include ultra-high frequency (UHF) band and L band frequencies, as well as an update to RFGeo. The company's signal expansion into the UHF band enables monitoring of push-to-talk radios, which have the potential to aid the discovery of cross-border smuggling operations and poaching. The update to RFGeo includes a process to extract vessels' MMSI identifiers embedded into their channel 70 broadcasts. Once this happens, a specific vessel can be matched to its broadcast, enabling by emitter tracking of objects. The RFGeo update also includes a catalog of previously collected RF Geo data, so customers can order and access archived data.

In December 2019, the National Reconnaissance Office (NRO) granted HawkEye 360 a contract to explore combining commercial RF capabilities into NRO's geospatial intelligence architecture.

Also in 2019, the U.S. Federal Communications Commission (FCC) approved a license allowing HawkEye 360 to eventually launch up to 80 incremental satellites for the eventual steady-state operation of a 15-cluster constellation.

In 2020, the National Air and Space Museum added a full-size model of one of HawkEye 360's Pathfinder satellites to display in their museum as part of an upcoming exhibit detailing the story of the space age. In July, HawkEye 360 reported their second cluster of satellites has successfully completed their environmental testing: one of the last technical milestones before the second cluster for launch, which was launched on Spaceflight ride-share mission on 24 January 2021 aboard a SpaceX Falcon 9.

HawkEye 360 has plans to execute and maintain a 30-satellite constellation, and the company is scheduled to launch new clusters once a quarter starting in early 2021.

Technology 
Currently, HawkEye 360 has three small satellites in the Pathfinder cluster orbiting the earth at an altitude of 575 km. In order to precisely triangulate and map signals, the satellites fly in a special formation facilitated by a novel water propulsion system. Each satellite (also referred to as a Hawk) in the cluster has a Software-Defined Radio (SDR) with the ability to detect a wide range of radio frequencies, and once all three satellites have picked up on a common signal, they can trilaterate that signal with accuracies dependent upon the terrain, signal, and other factors.

HawkEye 360's second satellite cluster includes several improvements: the new satellites have the ability to collect multiple RF signals at one time to create layers of RF information. Each of the satellites also has an improved SDR, so they can collect higher quality data for more accurate geolocation. In addition to this, the satellites have more powerful processing to handle more data.

As of January 2023, 6 clusters have been launched (including the Pathfinder one), for a total of 18 satellites currently in orbit:

Maritime usage
In order to maintain maritime visibility, most vessels are mandated to use Automatic Identification System (AIS) beacons aboard vessels to locate them. Although AIS is a useful tool, there are many ways it can be rendered ineffective. Ships can turn their beacons off, effectively making them very difficult to detect and track. Other times, ships will input invalid coordinates (referred to as spoofing), so as to appear miles from their true location. Lastly, in high-traffic areas such as ports, it is difficult to distinguish vessels' signals due to the high density of RF activity.

HawkEye 360 collects and analyzes RF frequencies used by ships for navigation to see vessels true locations and fill gaps in AIS information. This information regarding illicit maritime activity could help in global efforts to combat pirating and illegal fishing.

Security and defense 
Data collected by HawkEye 360 can be used to monitor high-risk regions for unusual activity. For instance, HawkEye 360 observed increased RF activity in the Galwan River Valley off the China-India border, enabling tasking of Earth observation imagery that revealed a Chinese military buildup in the area that was contributing to regional unrest to include dozens of reported military casualties. This remote monitoring allows operatives to have an advantage of a more comprehensive understanding of an area before entering.

Telecommunications 
HawkEye 360 can be used to monitor frequency spectrum usage, to allow for planners to see in advance which areas have the highest density of RF activity and how spectrum resources can be dynamically deployed for use in that area. Monitoring could also eventually enable telecommunications firms to more easily determine which bands are under-utilized in order to more efficiently deploy spectrum resources.

Crisis Response 
Using the company's satellites, HawkEye 360 can locate RF signals emitted by activated emergency beacons, which will decrease the time and effort of search and rescue operations. In instances of natural disasters, HawkEye 360 will be able to detect and assess the health of operational towers to ensure access to viable modes of communication for first responders and survivors.

References 
 

Geographic data and information companies